The Door Through Space is a 1961 science fiction novel by American writer Marion Zimmer Bradley. An expansion of Bradley's story "Bird of Prey", which first appeared in the May 1957 issue of the magazine Venture, it is her first novel, and was published by Ace Books, bound tête-bêche with Rendezvous on a Lost World by A. Bertram Chandler.  

Although it is not part of her Darkover book series, Darkover is mentioned (as another planet) in passing in the book; numerous Darkover elements appear in the book, such as a red sun, Dry Towns with chained women, catmen and other nonhumans, Terran Empire trade cities, and a Ghost Wind.

Plot introduction
The novel concerns an intelligence agent and a blood feud in the Dry Towns in the north of a world called Wolf. Note that the text of the Ace Double printing differs in the last chapter from the text of the 1979 Ace stand-alone printing.

Publication history
 1961, US, Ace Books , pub date May 1961, paperback, Tête-bêche with Rendezvous on a Lost World by A. Bertram Chandler
 1979, UK, Arrow Books , pub date 1979, paperback

References

External links
 The Door Through Space at Project Gutenberg
 

Darkover books
1961 American novels
Novels by Marion Zimmer Bradley
American science fiction novels
Ace Books books